Crimstone railway station, also known as Crumstane railway station, served the town of Duns, Scottish Borders, Scotland, from 1849 to 1852 on the Duns branch line.

History 
The station was opened on 15 August 1849 by the North British Railway. To the east of the platforms was Crumstane Farm and a pair of sidings. The station closed in May 1852.

References 

Disused railway stations in the Scottish Borders
Former North British Railway stations
Railway stations in Great Britain opened in 1849
Railway stations in Great Britain closed in 1852
1848 establishments in Scotland
1852 disestablishments in Scotland